Aaron Parker (born December 28, 1986, in Buckner, Kentucky) is an American former professional soccer player.

Career

College
Parker attended Trinity High School and played college soccer at Elon University from 2005 to 2008.

Professional
Parker turned professional in 2009 when he joined the Wilmington Hammerheads in the USL Second Division. He made his professional debut on April 25, 2009, as a substitute in Wilmington's opening day 2–2 tie with the Charlotte Eagles.

References

External links
 Wilmington Hammerheads bio

1986 births
Living people
American soccer players
USL Second Division players
Wilmington Hammerheads FC players
Soccer players from Kentucky
Association football forwards